Goodman Creek is a stream in the U.S. state of Washington.

Goodman Creek bears the name of a government surveyor. It has also been known by the name Tsa-dis-qualth, meaning "narrow mouth overhung with bush". In one late 19th century publication it was also referred to as the Keh-chen-whilt River.

Tributaries
 Falls Creek
 Minter Creek

See also
List of rivers of Washington

References

Rivers of Jefferson County, Washington
Rivers of Washington (state)